Nariman Point is a prominent downtown area of Mumbai in Maharashtra, India. Located on the southern tip of the Mumbai peninsula, at the end of the Mumbai's Marine Drive, Nariman Point houses some of India's prestigious business headquarters. 

It is bordered by Churchgate in North, Arabian Sea on West and South, by Colaba on East side. It is one of the tourist attractions of Mumbai due to its skyline, Arabian sea view, Marine drive and lots of luxury 5 star hotels, restaurants.

History
Prior to 1940, the area was part of the Arabian sea. A popular leader of the Congress, Khurshed Nariman (affectionately called Veer Nariman), a Bombay Municipal Corporation corporator, proposed the land reclamation of the area of sea near Churchgate. To accomplish this task, the shallow seafront was filled with debris from various parts of the city. Additional reclamations were carried out in the 1970s. A construction boom in that decade also led to the development of commercial high-rises in the area.

In 2006, prior to the financial crisis of 2007–08, Nariman point was the seventh most expensive location in the world for office space. However, by December 2012 Nariman Point had fallen to 25th place while Delhi's Connaught Place remained the fifth most expensive location despite many offices moving to Gurgaon and Noida. During the same period, Nariman Point also dropped from seventh to fifteenth most expensive location for office rentals. The reasons for the decline were the high prices, lower quality and age of construction, and increasing distances from residential hubs which have now moved northwards and to the suburbs. In the first three quarters of 2012, Nariman Point had a vacancy rate of almost 25%, compared with 18% in the rest of the Mumbai city.

2008 terrorist attacks  
On the evening of 26 November 2008, Pakistan trained Lashkar-e-Taiba Islamic terrorists attacked the luxury hotels Trident and Oberoi, located in this area. Both are luxury hotels. The terrorists attacked people with AK-47 assault rifles and Hand Grenades. This was part of the larger Mumbai terrorist attack. 166 people were killed, 238 injured to various degrees, and the Taj Hotel was besieged for 3 days. The Mumbai police apprehended one of the terrorists, Ajmal Kasab. The rest were eliminated in various operations by India's security forces.

Economy

Air India had its headquarters in the Air India Building for many years.

Renewable Energy and Power companies Ind Renewable Enercy Ltd and Vakharia Power Infrastructure Ltd are headquartered at Regent Chambers, 208 Nariman Point, Mumbai.

At one time All Nippon Airways maintained its Mumbai sales office in the Oberoi Trident Towers in Nariman Point.

Gallery

References

External links

Economy of Mumbai
Neighbourhoods in Mumbai
High-technology business districts in India
Central business districts in India